Dipterocarpus palembanicus is a species of tree in the family Dipterocarpaceae. There are 2 subspecies: borneensis and palembanicus.

It is found in Borneo, Malaya, and Sumatera.

References 

palembanicus
Trees of Sumatra
Trees of Malaya
Trees of Borneo